Candler v Crane, Christmas & Co [1951] 2 KB 164 is an English tort law case on negligent misstatement.

In the case, Denning LJ delivered a dissenting judgment, arguing that a duty of care arose when making negligent statements. His dissenting judgment was later upheld by the House of Lords in Hedley Byrne v Heller 1963.

Facts
Donald Ogilvie was the director of a company called Trevaunance Hydraulic Tin Mines Ltd, which mined tin in Cornwall. He needed more capital, so he placed an advertisement in The Times on 8 July 1946 which read,

"£10,000. Established Tin Mine (low capitalisation) in Cornwall seeks further capital. Install additional milling plant. Directorship and active participation open to suitable applicant - Apply"

Candler responded, saying he was interested in investing £2000, provided he was shown the company's accounts. Ogilvie instructed Crane, Christmas & Co, a firm of auditors, to prepare the company’s accounts and balance sheet. The draft accounts were shown to Candler in the presence of the auditor's clerk, a Mr Fraser. Candler relied on their accuracy and subscribed for £2,000 worth of shares in the company; but the company was actually in a very poor state. Ogilvie used the £2,000 on himself and then went bankrupt. Candler lost all the money he invested and brought an action against the accountants, Crane, Christmas & Co. for negligently misrepresenting the state of the company. As there was no contractual relationship between the parties, no case arose in misrepresentation, and so the action was brought in tort for pure economic loss.

Judgment
The majority of the Court of Appeal (Cohen LJ and Asquith LJ) relied on the case of Derry v Peek to refuse a remedy to the plaintiff, holding that loss resulting from negligent misstatement was not actionable in the absence of any contractual or fiduciary relationship between the parties.

Denning LJ (as the future Master of the Rolls then was) delivered a dissent, in which he argued that any person in the reasonable contemplation of someone making a statement who might rely on that statement is owed a duty of care in tort. He was asked to read his decision first.

See also

Cann v Willson (1888) 39 Ch.D 39, a valuer instructed by a mortgagor sent his report to the mortgagee who made an advance in reliance on the valuation. The valuer was held liable in the tort of negligence to the mortgagee for failing to carry out the valuation with reasonable care and skill.
Hedley Byrne & Co Ltd v Heller & Partners Ltd [1964] AC 465
Ministry of Housing and Local Government v Sharp [1970] 2 QB 223, the local authority was held liable to the Ministry because of the failure of an employee of the authority to exercise reasonable skill and care in searching for entries in the local land charges register. The search certificate prepared by the clerk negligently failed to record a charge of £1,828 11s. 5d. in favour of the Ministry. Lord Denning MR, 268, rejected that a duty of care only arose when there was a voluntary assumption of responsibility, rather "from the fact that the person making it knows, or ought to know, that others, being his neighbours in this regard, would act on the faith of the statement being accurate."
Smith v Eric S. Bush
Caparo Industries plc v Dickman
White v Jones
Her Majesty's Commissioners of Customs and Excise v Barclays Bank Plc

References

English tort case law
Lord Denning cases
1951 in British law
Court of Appeal (England and Wales) cases
1951 in case law
Mining in Cornwall